The 2002 FIRA Women's European Nations Cup was held as a preparation for the World Cup, a short tournament for four nations who were not in the Six Nations took place in Italy. While it does not appear to be part of the Women's European Championship sequence, it was very similar to the European Championship, especially the Pool B competitions. A similar tournament took place before the World Cup in 2006.

Bracket

Semi finals

3rd/4th place

Final

See also
Women's international rugby union

External links
FIRA website with tournament programme

2002
2002 rugby union tournaments for national teams
International women's rugby union competitions hosted by Italy
2001–02 in European women's rugby union
2001–02 in Italian rugby union
Rug
rugby union
rugby union
rugby union